The Battle of Požarevac was a battle of the Second Serbian Uprising between the Serbian Revolutionaries and Ottoman forces at Požarevac from 1 July to 7 July 1815. It ended in a Serbian victory.

Battle
After the liberation of Čačak, Miloš Obrenović set out with a large army of 12,000 insurgents to liberate Požarevac. Miloš was informed that a large army was gathering around Požarevac and that the Turks were being assisted by the delibasha of Vidin's vezir along with 1900 deli troops, who had made six trenches and had one cannon. On the way to Požarevac in Batočina, Miloš found a trench with 2000 Arnauts. There, the insurgents fought with the Arnauts, but the Arnauts surrendered for three days. Then, after this victory, the insurgents crossed the Morava and headed towards Požarevac.

On the way to Požarevac, Miloš and the insurgents ran into the deli troops. The Serbs immediately started fighting the delis, but at one point they hesitated, seeing how fiercely the delis fought. Miloš then launched an attack on the delis with his personal initiative. He rushed on horseback towards Asan-delibaša, addressing him with the words: "Delibasha, you may have a place on the other side, but I really have no place other than here, dead or alive." The insurgents then defeated the delis who retreated to the trenches. On the first day, the Serbs took the first trench to attack, then in the next two days the next two trenches, while the Turks did not stay in the big trench with the cannon and two small trenches to the church and the mosque. Miloš then sent his scribe with a proposal that the Turks surrender and leave the pocket and the cannon, and that he would get a safe passage to Turkey. During the battles, the brother-in-law of Prince Miloš and the brother of Princess Ljubica, Jovan Vukomanović, died. Princess Ljubica later raised two apple trees at the place where her brother Jovan died, where the battle took place. As part of the Serbian victory, the epic folk song Boj na Požarevcu was sung.

Legacy
The battle was screened in the Vuk Karadžić TV series. The series shows the fight of the Serbian infantry and cavalry with the Turks and the scene in which Miloš Obrenović on horseback attacks Asan-delibaša with his famous words. Anastas Jovanović made a lithograph, "Prince Miloš in Battle", in which Prince Miloš is shown with the insurgents fighting against the Turks on horseback. The lithograph, together with the lithograph "Karađorđe in color", was published in the monograph of Anastas Jovanović in the residence of Princess Ljubica.

References

Požarevac
Conflicts in 1815
Second Serbian Uprising
1815 in Serbia
Požarevac
July 1815 events